William Dennis "Denny" Price (January 28, 1938 – July 7, 2000) was an American basketball player and coach. He played for the University of Oklahoma (OU) and the Phillips 66ers. He then embarked on a coaching career at Oklahoma, the Phoenix Suns and Sam Houston State. He was the father of former National Basketball Association (NBA) players Mark and Brent Price.

Born and raised in Norman, Oklahoma, Price came to the Oklahoma Sooners out of Norman High School to play for coach Doyle Parrack. He played both baseball and basketball there, earning All-Big Eight Conference honors in both. After graduating from OU, Price played five seasons for the Phillips 66ers of the Amateur Athletic Union (AAU), earning All-American honors in 1962 and 1963.

Following his playing career, Price turned to coaching, first at Shawnee High School in Oklahoma, then accepting an assistant coaching position at his alma mater under head coach John MacLeod in 1969. When MacLeod left the Sooners to become coach of the National Basketball Association's expansion Phoenix Suns in 1973, Price followed to become the franchise's first assistant coach. After two seasons, Price realized his goal of becoming a head coach, taking the head coaching position at Sam Houston State University in 1975. He resigned after four seasons with a record of 35–71.

Price spent several years in business before accepting an offer to become head men's coach and athletic director at Phillips University in Enid, Oklahoma in 1986. He retired from the men's team in 1993, but took on coaching the women's team when the previous coach was fired during the 1995–96 season, holding this role until the school closed in 1998. His last coaching job came as coach of the Oklahoma Storm of the United States Basketball League (USBL) in 2000.

Price died on July 7, 2000 of a heart attack while playing basketball with his sons.

References

External links
College playing statistics

1938 births
2000 deaths
American men's basketball coaches
American men's basketball players
American women's basketball coaches
Basketball coaches from Oklahoma
Basketball players from Oklahoma
College men's basketball head coaches in the United States
College women's basketball coaches in the United States
Guards (basketball)
High school basketball coaches in Oklahoma
Oklahoma Sooners baseball players
Oklahoma Sooners men's basketball coaches
Oklahoma Sooners men's basketball players
Phillips 66ers players
Phillips Haymakers athletic directors
Phillips Haymakers men's basketball coaches
Phoenix Suns assistant coaches
Sam Houston Bearkats men's basketball coaches
Sportspeople from Norman, Oklahoma
United States Basketball League coaches